The men's track time trial event at the 1980 Summer Olympics took place on 22 July 1980 in Moscow Olympic Velodrome. There were 18 competitors from 18 nations, with one additional cyclist entered but not starting. The event was won by Lothar Thoms of East Germany, the nation's second consecutive victory in the men's track time trial (tying Australia, Italy, and Denmark for second-most all-time). Aleksandr Panfilov of the Soviet Union took silver, the nation's first medal in the event since 1960. David Weller's bronze remains—through the 2020 Games—Jamaica's only medal outside of track and field athletics (86 athletics medals, 1 cycling medal). Denmark's three-Games medal streak (entirely the work of Niels Fredborg) ended.

Background
This was the 13th appearance of the event, which had previously been held in 1896 and every Games since 1928. It would be held every Games until being dropped from the programme after 2004. The only returning cyclist from 1976 was eleventh-place finisher David Weller of Jamaica. There were few medal contenders among the boycotting nations. The favorite was East German Lothar Thoms, the 1978 and 1979 world champion.

Ecuador, Libya, and Zimbabwe each made their debut in the men's track time trial. France and Great Britain each made their 13th appearance, having competed at every appearance of the event.

Competition format
The event was a time trial on the track, with each cyclist competing separately to attempt to achieve the fastest time. Each cyclist raced one kilometre from a standing start.

Records
The following were the world and Olympic records prior to the competition.

Lothar Thoms broke the world record by nearly a full second, recording a time of 1:02.955. No other cyclist came close to the old record time.

Schedule
All times are Moscow Time (UTC+3)

Results

References

Track cycling at the 1980 Summer Olympics
Cycling at the Summer Olympics – Men's track time trial